James Madison Slade (September 8, 1812 – April 10, 1875) was a Vermont politician who served as the 21st lieutenant governor of Vermont from 1856 to 1857.

Biography
The son of Governor William Slade, James Madison Slade was born in Middlebury, Vermont on September 8, 1812.  He was raised and educated in Middlebury and became a dry goods merchant.

Active in politics as a member of the American Party, also called the Know Nothings, and later as a member of the Republican Party, Slade was Clerk of the Vermont House of Representatives from 1853 to 1856. From 1856 to 1857 he was Vermont's Lieutenant Governor.

Slade was employed by the United States Department of the Treasury in Washington, D.C. from 1860 to 1863

From 1868 to 1870 Slade served as one of Addison County's Assistant Judges, and he was a member of the Vermont House from 1871 to 1872.

Slade died in Middlebury on April 10, 1875 and was buried in Middlebury's West Cemetery.

Family
Slade's son James M. Slade, Jr. (1843-1899) became a lawyer who served as Addison County State's Attorney and Probate Judge and as a member of the Vermont House of Representatives.  From 1870 to 1871 the younger Slade was Secretary of Civil and Military Affairs, or chief assistant, to Governor John Wolcott Stewart.

References 

1812 births
1875 deaths
Vermont Know Nothings
Lieutenant Governors of Vermont
Republican Party members of the Vermont House of Representatives
People from Middlebury, Vermont
Vermont state court judges
Burials in Vermont
19th-century American judges